Magda Apanowicz (born November 8, 1985) is a Canadian actress. She is best known for her roles as Andy Jensen on the ABC Family series Kyle XY, as Lacy Rand in the Syfy science fiction drama series Caprica and as Emily (born Maya Hartwell) on the science fiction series Continuum. Recently, she starred as Sandy in the Netflix thriller series You.

Personal life
Apanowicz is of Polish descent and spent a year in Poland in the ninth grade. She lived there with her uncle and attended a school in Jelenia Góra.  She later studied at Vancouver Film School.

Career
She became interested in acting at the age of ten, after her brother introduced her to Pulp Fiction. She began her career in 2002 with brief appearances in the TV series Jeremiah and John Doe. From 2007 to 2009, she played the role of Andy Jensen on Kyle XY. In 2008 she starred in the Hallmark Channel original movie Every Second Counts.

In 2009, Apanowicz was cast as Lacy Rand, a series regular, in the television drama Caprica, with Eric Stoltz and Alessandra Torresani. She later appeared in Hellcats. In 2012, she guest starred in the second season of Jane Espenson's romantic comedy web series, Husbands.

In 2013, Apanowicz appeared as Emily in the series Continuum She also appeared in the Eli Roth horror film  The Green Inferno as Samantha. Although it was filmed in 2012, The Green Inferno was internationally released in 2015.

In 2017, Apanowicz was cast as Angela in the science fiction thriller film Volition. It was released in 2020.

In 2019, Apanowicz was cast in the recurring role of Sandy on the second season of the Netflix thriller You.

Filmography

References

External links 

 
 

1985 births
Actresses from Vancouver
Canadian child actresses
Canadian film actresses
Canadian people of Polish descent
Canadian television actresses
Living people
Vancouver Film School alumni
20th-century Canadian actresses
21st-century Canadian actresses